The ninth Asian Championships in Athletics were held in 1991 in Kuala Lumpur, Malaysia.

Medal summary

Men's events

 Some English-language sources, such as GBR Athletics, erroneously state that Kim Bok-joo was 1991 Asian Championships runner-up in the men's 1500 m. Contemporary English and Korean sources indicate it was his similarly-named teammate Kim Bong-yu who achieved these feats.

Women's events

Medal table

See also
 1991 in athletics (track and field)

References

External links
 GBR Athletics

Asian Athletics Championships
Asian
Athletics
International sports competitions hosted by Malaysia
Sport in Kuala Lumpur
1991 in Asian sport
Asian Athletics Championships